Zoltán Kállai (born ) is a Hungarian male artistic gymnast, representing his nation at international competitions. He competed at world championships, including the 2009 World Artistic Gymnastics Championships in London, United Kingdom.

References

1984 births
Living people
Hungarian male artistic gymnasts
Place of birth missing (living people)